Emam-Ali Habibi Goudarzi (born 27 May 1931) is a retired Iranian freestyle wrestler. He won gold medals at the 1958 Asian Games; 1959, 1961 and 1962 world championships; and 1956 Olympics, placing fourth in 1960. In 2007 he was inducted into the FILA Hall of Fame. Habibi was the fourth and the last son in a large family. He lost his father at the age of 12.

References

External links

External links

1931 births
Living people
Olympic wrestlers of Iran
Wrestlers at the 1956 Summer Olympics
Wrestlers at the 1960 Summer Olympics
Iranian male sport wrestlers
Olympic gold medalists for Iran
Place of birth missing (living people)
Asian Games gold medalists for Iran
Olympic medalists in wrestling
Asian Games medalists in wrestling
Wrestlers at the 1958 Asian Games
World Wrestling Champions
Medalists at the 1956 Summer Olympics
People from Babol
Medalists at the 1958 Asian Games
People from Qaem Shahr
Sportspeople from Mazandaran province
20th-century Iranian people
21st-century Iranian people